Eucalyptus jensenii, commonly known as Wandi ironbark, is a species of tree that is endemic to northern Australia. It has hard, coarse black "ironbark", egg-shaped to lance-shaped adult leaves, flower buds in groups of seven, creamy white flowers and barrel-shaped to conical fruit.

Description
It has hard, rough, coarse black "ironbark" on the trunk and larger branches. Flowering occurs from January to May and the flowers are creamy white.

Taxonomy and naming
Eucalyptus jensenii was first formally described in 1922 by Joseph Maiden from a specimen collected near Wandi by Harald Ingemann Jensen and the description was published in Maiden's book A Critical Revision of the Genus Eucalyptus. Wandi is an old gold-mining camp near Pine Creek in the Northern Territory. The specific epithet honours the collector of the type specimen.

Distribution and habitat
Wandi ironbark grows in open forest and woodland, usually on slopes and tablelands but sometimes on flats and near swamps. It occurs in the Kimberley region and Dampier Peninsula  in Western Australia and in northern parts of the northern Territory, including on Groote Eylandt.

See also

List of Eucalyptus species

References

Eucalypts of Western Australia
Trees of Australia
jensenii
Myrtales of Australia
Plants described in 1922
Taxa named by Joseph Maiden